Daniel Parish Kidder (October 18, 1815 – July 29, 1891) was an American Methodist Episcopal theologian and writer who spent several years in Brazil.

Biography

Kidder was born in 1815 at Darien, Genesee County, New York
He graduated from Wesleyan University in 1836, entered the ministry, and in 1837 went to Brazil to work as a missionary on the Northeast and the Amazon.

After his return to the United States in 1840, he served as a corresponding secretary of the Methodist Sunday School Union and editor of Sunday-school publications and tracts (1844–56), as professor of homiletics in Garrett Biblical Institute for 15 years and in Drew Theological Seminary for 10 years, and as secretary of the board of education of his church (1880–87).  The rest of his life was spent in Evanston, Illinois.

Bibliography
Kidder's Treatise on Homiletics (1864, 1884) and The Christian Pastorate (1871) are the books for which he is best known.  Others include:  
 Mormonism and the Mormons (1844)  
 Sketches of Residence and Travel in Brazil (two volumes, 1845)  
 Brazil and the Brazilians Portrayed in Historical and Descriptive Sketches (eighth edition, 1868)  (with James Cooley Fletcher)
 The Fratricide "Reminiscences of The West India Islands (1851 Second Series, No.1) Published by Lane & Scott
 The Sunday-Scholar's Mirror: A Monthly Magazine for Children   Editor, 1850–1854.

References

External links
 
 
 

Methodist ministers
Methodist missionaries in Brazil
Wesleyan University alumni
People from Darien, New York
American Methodist missionaries
American theologians
1815 births
1891 deaths
American expatriates in Brazil